This is a list of films which have placed number one at the weekend box office in the United Kingdom during 2022.

Films

Highest-grossing films

In-Year Release

Notes

See also
 List of British films

References

External links
Weekend box office figures | BFI

2022
United Kingdom
2022 in British cinema